The Suite 8F Group, also referred to as the 8F Crowd, was a network of politically active businessmen in Texas from the 1930s into the 1960s. "Suite 8F" refers to Herman Brown's Suite at the Lamar Hotel (demolished) in Houston. Herman Brown, one of the co-founders of the construction firm Brown and Root, made his primary home in Austin until 1948. With the company headquarters in Houston, Brown typically traveled from Austin once per week, then stayed at his room at the Lamar for a few days. Yet other members of his family stayed there as well. In addition, Gus Wortham, another member of the group, lived in the room next door, 7F. Jesse H. Jones, the developer and owner of the Lamar Hotel, lived on its top floor and was also a member of the group.

Herman Brown, and his brother, George R. Brown, used their suite in the Lamar Hotel as a social, business, and political club. They planned and discussed events as varied as hunting and racing, pipelines and steel plants, and philanthropy and political candidates. James A. Elkins, a Houston lawyer and banker, wielded great influence and gained a reputation as a deal maker. For example, one friend credited Elkins for facilitating the sale of local radio station. Sometimes the group formed a consensus around a political candidate, then supported him as a group. For example, the group backed Oscar Holcombe, Sam Rayburn, and the first two campaigns of Franklin Delano Roosevelt for President of the United States. 

According to Texas Monthly, the 8F Crowd had gained "unequaled influence in state and national government" after the end World War II when George R. Brown, Gus Wortham, and Charles Francis of Vinson & Elkins founded Texas Eastern. The group was reported to exercise leverage over Big Oil. The 8F Crowd had connections to various media outlets including the Houston Chronicle, the Houston Post, television station KPRC, and radio stations KPRC and KTRK-TV.

Membership 
The core group, or the persons who were active for the longest time, were James Abercrombie, Herman and George R. Brown, James Elkins, William and Oveta Culp Hobby, Robert E. "Bob" Smith, and Gus Wortham. Jesse H. Jones served as the group's "godfather," sometimes hosting meetings upstairs in his penthouse apartment. 

Other individuals are reported to have been members to the Suite 8F Group:

 John Connally, Governor of Texas
 Hugh Roy Cullen of Quintana Petroleum
 Morgan J. Davis, of Humble Oil
 Lyndon B. Johnson, President of the United States
 Walter Mischer
 Sam Rayburn, Speaker of the United States House of Representatives
 Albert Thomas, chairman of the House Appropriations Committee, Subcommittee on Defense 
  Walter G. Hall  1907-2000 - Texas Banker, Galveston County Democrat Boss and political financier, Owner of Citizens State Bank, Citizens Investment Co. Graduate of Rice University. Involved in locating and naming of Johnson Space Center. Friend to LBJ/Lady Bird. Associations with 8F members in that era. 2021/>
 Felix Tijerina, Mexican-born owner of Houston restaurants
 William Vinson, Great Southern Life Insurance
 Alvin Wirtz, Thomas Corcoran, Homer Thornberry and Edward Clark, were four lawyers who also worked closely with the Suite 8F Group.

Suite 8F helped to coordinate the political activities of other right-wing politicians and businessmen based in the South; these included Robert B. Anderson, president of the Texas Mid-Continent Oil and Gas Association, Secretary of the Navy and Secretary of the Treasury; Robert Kerr of Kerr-McGee Oil Industries; Billie Sol Estes, an entrepreneur in the cotton industry; Glenn McCarthy of McCarthy Oil and Gas Company; Earl E. T. Smith, of U.S. Sugar Corporation; Fred Korth, Continental National Bank and Navy Secretary; Ross Sterling of Humble Oil; Texas oil magnates Sid Richardson and Clint Murchison, Sr., H. L. Hunt of Placid Oil; Eugene B. Germany (Mustang Oil Company), David Harold Byrd, chairman of Byrd Oil Corporation; Lawrence D. Bell, of Bell Helicopter; William D. Pawley (business interests in Cuba), Senators George Smathers, Richard Russell, James Eastland, Benjamin Everett Jordan; and lobbyists Fred Black and Bobby Baker, also affiliated with the Serve-U Corporation.

References 

 Dan Briody, The Halliburton Agenda: The Politics of Oil and Money

Politics of Texas
History of Houston
Petroleum in Texas